Omorgus subcarinatus is a beetle of the family Trogidae. It is found in Australia.

References 

subcarinatus
Beetles described in 1864